Dugald Thomson (28 December 1849 – 27 November 1922) was an Australian politician. He campaigned for Federation as a member of the New South Wales Legislative Assembly (1894–1901), and was subsequently elected to the new federal House of Representatives (1901–1910). He served as Minister for Home Affairs in the Reid Government from 1904 to 1905.

Early life
Thomson was born in Camberwell, London, England, to Scottish parents Jane (née Duncan) and John Thomson. His father was an insurance broker. The family emigrated to South Australia the year after he was born, and later moved to Victoria. Thomson completed his education in England and trained at his uncle's business in Liverpool. After spending two years at sea, he returned to Melbourne at the age of 19 and joined the merchant firm of Robert Harper. He set up a Sydney branch in 1877 and was a managing partner until 1892. He also established the North Shore Steam Ferry Company with James Garvan.

New South Wales politics
Thomson won the New South Wales Legislative Assembly seat of Warringah in 1894 and supported the Free Trade ministry of George Reid, although he opposed its legislation on workplace conditions, made necessary by its dependence on Labor Party support.

Federal politics

Thomson was a supporter of federation and won the House of Representatives seat of North Sydney at the 1901 election and held it to his retirement prior to the 1910 election. In early 1904, following the retirement of William McMillan, he was elected deputy leader of the Free Traders. He relinquished the position to Joseph Cook on 28 July 1905.

Thomson was Minister for Home Affairs from 1904 to 1905 in the Reid Ministry. During his period in parliament he spoke often on maritime matters, and served on two royal commissions.

In July 1909, Thomson was elected president of the newly formed New South Wales Federal Liberal League.

Thomson died in the Sydney suburb of Kirribilli at the age of 72, unmarried.

Notes

 

Free Trade Party members of the Parliament of Australia
Members of the New South Wales Legislative Assembly
Members of the Australian House of Representatives for North Sydney
Members of the Australian House of Representatives
Members of the Cabinet of Australia
1849 births
1922 deaths
Commonwealth Liberal Party members of the Parliament of Australia
20th-century Australian politicians
People from Camberwell
English emigrants to Australia
Burials at Gore Hill Cemetery